Xinghuacun Subdistrict is a subdistrict in Luyang District, Hefei, Anhui. , it administers the following six residential communities: 
Wuli Community
Lindian Community
Jindu Community
Lingbi Road Community
Jiqiaoxincun Community
Songzhu Community

History 
The sub district was formed on 28 July, 2004.

See also 
 List of township-level divisions of Anhui

References 

Township-level divisions of Anhui
Hefei